Fort Constantine, Fort Konstantin, Fort Constantin, or Fort Grand Duke Constantine may refer to:

Fort Konstantin (Germany), Koblenz, Germany
Fort Constantin (Russia), Kronstadt, Russia
 or Fort Constantine, part of fortifications of Sevastopol during Siege of Sevastopol (1854–1855) in Crimean War
Fort Constantine (Yukon) near Forty Mile, Yukon, Alaska, United States
 Fort Constantine, Canadian ship of the Fort ship type
 RFA Fort Constantine, a Royal Fleet Auxiliary ship